Felicia Walters (born 6 January 1992) is a Trinidadian cricketer who plays as an opening batter and part-time medium pace bowler. In May 2017, she was named in the West Indies squad for the 2017 Women's Cricket World Cup. She made her Women's One Day International (WODI) debut for the West Indies against Australia in the 2017 Women's Cricket World Cup on 26 June 2017. She played domestic cricket for Trinidad and Tobago.

References

External links

1992 births
Living people
Trinidad and Tobago women cricketers
West Indies women One Day International cricketers
West Indian women cricketers